The Mysore Mallige Scandal refers to a sex scandal in 2001 that involved the leaking of a home video made by a couple. This scandal broke out when the home video made by the couple themselves was leaked out by a friend of the boy involved. Both the boy and the girl were students of an Malnad college of engineering. The words Mysore Mallige meaning the Jasmine (in Kannada) of Mysore is actually a double entendre because it originally refers to the flower variety by the same name.

History
The video was filmed by the couple to capture their lovemaking. This footage leaked when the boy went to get the tape converted to a CD. Later, one of the boy's friends who got hold of the footage and posted it on message boards on the internet under the name Mysore Mallige.  Once the footage went viral, police investigation started and the boy who leaked it was identified and beaten up by the victim girl's family. After the video was widely circulated on CDs, the couple were forced to marry in police station, they have a child and they are still married not separated and doing good in their lives. The story was first reported by Ravi Belagere from Bangalore.

In popular culture
Mysore Mallige became a very popular video and was widely discussed by scholars concerned with matters of cyber law, pornography, exhibitionism and voyeurism. Bharath Murthy, a filmmaker, even made a documentary film that showcases different people's responses after having seen the clip. It is titled Jasmine of Mysore and was released in 2007. Since then, this incident has acquired a cult status.

References

See also
Looking closer at porn with X ray spectacles - Nishant Shah

Scandals in India
History of Karnataka (1947–present)
Crime in Karnataka